McMenemy is a surname. Notable people with the surname include:

Dorian McMenemy (born 1996), Dominican Republic swimmer
Frank McMenemy (1910–1976), Scottish footballer
Harry McMenemy (1912–1997), Scottish footballer
Jimmy McMenemy (1880–1965), Scottish footballer
John McMenemy (1908–1983), Scottish footballer
Lawrie McMenemy (born 1936), English footballer and manager
Neil McMenemy (born 1967), Scottish triple jumper
Shayne McMenemy (born 1976), Australian rugby league player
Simon McMenemy (born 1977), English football manager